Star Awards 2010 (Chinese: 红星大奖 2010) was a double television award ceremony held in Singapore. It is part of the annual Star Awards organised by MediaCorp for the two free-to-air channels, MediaCorp Channel 8 and MediaCorp Channel U.

The nomination lists for the main categories and popularity awards were announced on 3 February and 18 March 2010, respectively.

This year Star Awards marked the first time the Professional and Technical awards (given out to backstage crew and scriptwriters) were telecast and presented in one show (first show), and was also the second year to host multiple award shows airing on two separate Sunday nights, after 2007. While the first show was still held at MediaCorp TV Theatre, the second show was, for the third time in Star Awards history, being held on the new location of Resorts World Sentosa, after 1996 and 2006.

Also introduced this year were the six awards, Favourite Male Character, Favourite Female Character, Most Unforgettable TV Villain, Male Media Darling, Female Media Darling and Rocket Award, all of which were awarded on the first show (亮闪八方 (lit. Dazzling Awards)). The first three awards were decided by online voting that run from 1 March until 11 April with the results being announced during the first ceremony. The Rocket Award was also introduced, which mainly focuses on the artiste who contributed the most improvement throughout the past year.

Both of the ceremonies were broadcast live on 18 and 25 April 2010. The post-show was held after the second ceremony at 10pm on Channel U.

Together and Reunion Dinner each won four awards combined from both ceremonies, for the former it holds the largest nominations for the ceremony with 20 and also won the Best Drama Serial, while the biggest winner for the Variety/Info-ed category It's A Small World won two.

Programme details

Winners and nominees
Unless otherwise stated, winners are listed first, highlighted in boldface.

Show 1 (亮闪八方)

Awards eligible for Audience Voting
The online voting for Favourite Male & Female Character was revealed on 18 March 2010, and were closed on 18 April, at 9pm. Voting for other categories closed at 8.15pm.

Special Awards
Rocket Award
The Rocket award, debuting this year, was given to the artiste with the most improvement in the performance of his/her respective field of profession for the past year.

 Viewership awards 
Unlike previous awards, only the shows with the highest viewerships (for Drama Serial and Variety/Info-Ed Programmes, respectively) were listed and awarded.

Show 2
Main category

All Time Favourite Artiste
This award is a special achievement award given out to artiste(s) who have achieved a maximum of 10 popularity awards over 10 years. Top 10 winning years the recipients were awarded together are highlighted in boldface'''.

Awards eligible for Audience Voting
The nominations for Top 10 Most Popular Male & Female Artistes were announced and started on 18 March 2010, and ended on 25 April at 9pm.

Top 10 Most Popular Artistes

Presenters and performers
The following individuals presented awards or performed musical numbers.

Show 1

Show 2

Awards
The first show of 2010 won the Best Variety Special on the following ceremony next year; it was Star Awards'' second win for the Best Variety Special since the show won its first award in 2007 (for the 2006 ceremony).

See also
 MediaCorp Channel 8
 MediaCorp Channel U
 Star Awards

External links
Official website

References

2010 television awards
Star Awards